Vecgulbene Manor was a manor in the historical region of Vidzeme, eastern Latvia.

Manor had 2 main buildings: Red Palace and White Palace.

Gallery

See also
List of palaces and manor houses in Latvia

References

External links
 Manor Vecgulbene (White Palace)
  Vecgulbene Manor
 

Manor houses in Latvia